Primula bulleyana is a species of flowering plant in the family Primulaceae, native to hillsides in China.

Description
Primula bulleyana is one of a group known as candelabra primulas, so called because of the tiered arrangement of their flowers. It is a semi-evergreen perennial. The whorls of multiple orange-yellow flowers, opening from red buds, are arranged in tiers. It thrives in a bright, moist environment, such as beside a pond.

This plant has gained the Royal Horticultural Society's Award of Garden Merit.

History
It was first introduced by George Forrest from Yunnan province, China, in 1906, and named after Arthur K Bulley, his first sponsor, who was a cotton broker from Liverpool and a keen amateur gardener.  He founded the Bees Ltd. nursery and was responsible for the introduction of many hardy plants and alpines to Britain in the early 20th century.

Subspecies

The plant formerly known as Primula beesiana (Bee's primrose) is now regarded as a synonym of P. bulleyana subsp. beesiana . It is similar in size and form to its parent, but has purple blooms. It is likewise a recipient of the RHS award.

References

bulleyana